Jason Crain (born August 24, 1966) is an American physicist based in the United Kingdom. He was appointed to IBM Research in 2016. He previously held the chair of applied physics at the University of Edinburgh in Scotland and was appointed director of research at the UK's National Physical Laboratory (NPL) in London (as of 2015) where he also held the role of head of physical sciences (since 2007). He is also visiting professor at the IBM TJ Watson Research Center in New York. His background is in the structure and physics of disordered matter at the molecular scale with a view to applications.

Early life
Born on August 24, 1966, in New York City, he obtained his undergraduate degree from the Massachusetts Institute of Technology in 1989, receiving the 1988 Orloff Prize for Research.

Career
Crain was a research scientist at Fujitsu in Japan (1990) as one of the first interns of the MIT-Japan exchange programme. He obtained his PhD from the University of Edinburgh in 1993. Crain was appointed to a Royal Society of Edinburgh Research Fellowship in 1995, and then appointed to the academic staff at Edinburgh, where he held the chair of applied physics until 2016. He was elected Fellow of the Institute of Physics in 2002. He was then appointed as head of physical sciences and director of research at the National Physical Laboratory from 2007 to 2016, at which point he was appointed to IBM Research.  He holds appointments as senior visiting fellow at the National Nuclear Laboratory (from 2015) and visiting professor at the University of Oxford (from 2018).

Works
Crain has over 200 refereed scientific publications with an h-index of 40 according to the Web of Science which include
 Molecular segregation observed in a concentrated alcohol-water solution S Dixit, J Crain, JL Finney AK Soper Nature (2002) 416:829-832 DOI: 10.1038/416829a
 Structure and elasticity of MgO at high pressure BB Karki, L Stixrude and J. Crain (1997) American Mineralogist82: 51-60 
 Elastic instabilities in crystals from ab initio stress-strain relations BB Karki, GJ Ackland and J Crain (1997) Journal of Physics: Condensed Matter 9 Pages: 8579-8589 
 Reversible pressure-induced phase transitions in metastable phases of silicon J Crain, GJ Ackland, JR Maclean, and PD Hatton Physical Review B (1994) 50:13043-13046 Published: 
 Methanol-water solutions: A bi-percolating liquid mixture L Dougan, SP Bates, R Hargreaves, JP Fox J Crain, JL Finney, V Reat, and AK Soper Journal of Chemical Physics (2994) 121:6456-6462 
 Structure and properties of Silicon-XII RO Piltz, JR Maclean, SJ Clark, PD Hatton and J Crain Physical Review B (1995) 52:4072-4085 
 Cellular solid behaviour of liquid crystal colloids - 1. Phase separation and morphology VJ Anderson, EM Terentjev, SP Meeker, J Crain, and WCK Poon European Physical Journal E (2001) 4:11-20 DOI: 10.1007/PL00013680
 Nanoscale imaging reveals laterally expanding antimicrobial pores in lipid bilayers PD Rakowska, H Jiang, S Ray, A Pyne, B Lamarre, M Carr, PJ Judge J Crain and M Ryadnov Proceedings of the National Academy of Sciences 110 (22), 8918-8923

Press coverage
His work has been covered on BBC News on HIV research; ChemEurope on "DNA Zippers"; and 
Science Daily on "Electronically Coarse Grained Water" 
"Towards the ultimate model of water"
and 
"Squishy transistors"

References

1966 births
Living people
Academics of the University of Edinburgh
American expatriate academics
American expatriates in Japan
American expatriates in Scotland
21st-century American physicists
Fellows of the Institute of Physics
Fellows of the Royal Society of Edinburgh
MIT Department of Physics alumni
Scientists from New York City